Khawar Ali (born 20 December 1985) is a Pakistani-born cricketer who plays for the Oman national cricket team. He made his Twenty20 International debut for Oman against Afghanistan in the 2015 ICC World Twenty20 Qualifier tournament on 25 July 2015. He made his List A debut for Oman in their three-match series against the United Arab Emirates in October 2016.

At the 2016 ICC World Cricket League Division Four tournament he was named man of the series.

In January 2018, he was named in Oman's squad for the 2018 ICC World Cricket League Division Two tournament. In August 2018, he was named the vice-captain of Oman's squad for the 2018 Asia Cup Qualifier tournament. In October 2018, he was named as the vice-captain of Oman's squad for the 2018 ICC World Cricket League Division Three tournament. In December 2018, he was named in Oman's team for the 2018 ACC Emerging Teams Asia Cup.

In March 2019, he was named as the vice-captain of Oman's team for the 2019 ICC World Cricket League Division Two tournament in Namibia. Oman finished in the top four places in the tournament, therefore gaining One Day International (ODI) status. Ali made his ODI debut for Oman on 27 April 2019, against Namibia, in the tournament's final.

In September 2019, he was named in Oman's squad for the 2019 ICC T20 World Cup Qualifier tournament. On 9 October 2019, in the match against the Netherlands in the 2019–20 Oman Pentangular Series, he took a hat-trick. In September 2021, he was named in Oman's squad for the 2021 ICC Men's T20 World Cup. The following month, in round seven of the 2019–2023 ICC Cricket World Cup League 2 tournament, Ali took his first five-wicket haul in ODI cricket, with 5 for 15 against Papua New Guinea.

References

External links
 
 

1985 births
Living people
Omani cricketers
Oman One Day International cricketers
Oman Twenty20 International cricketers
Pakistani emigrants to Oman
Pakistani expatriates in Oman
Twenty20 International hat-trick takers